The arrondissement of Dole is an arrondissement of France in the Jura department in the Bourgogne-Franche-Comté region. It has 190 communes.

Composition

The communes of the arrondissement of Dole are:

Abergement-la-Ronce
Abergement-le-Grand
Abergement-le-Petit
Abergement-lès-Thésy
Aiglepierre
Amange
Annoire
Arbois
Archelange
Aresches
Les Arsures
Asnans-Beauvoisin
Audelange
Augerans
Aumont
Aumur
Authume
Auxange
Balaiseaux
Bans
La Barre
Barretaine
Baverans
Belmont
Bersaillin
Besain
Biarne
Biefmorin
Bracon
Brainans
Brans
La Bretenière
Bretenières
Brevans
Buvilly
Cernans
Chaînée-des-Coupis
Chamblay
Chamole
Champagne-sur-Loue
Champagney
Champdivers
Champvans
La Chapelle-sur-Furieuse
La Châtelaine
Chatelay
Le Chateley
Châtenois
Chaussenans
Chaussin
Chaux-Champagny
Chemin
Chêne-Bernard
Chevigny
Chilly-sur-Salins
Chissey-sur-Loue
Choisey
Clucy
Colonne
Courtefontaine
Cramans
Crissey
Dammartin-Marpain
Damparis
Dampierre
Darbonnay
Le Deschaux
Dole
Dournon
Éclans-Nenon
Écleux
Les Essards-Taignevaux
Étrepigney
Évans
Falletans
Fay-en-Montagne
La Ferté
Le Fied
Foucherans
Fraisans
Frasne-les-Meulières
Gatey
Gendrey
Geraise
Germigney
Gevry
Grange-de-Vaivre
Gredisans
Grozon
Les Hays
Ivory
Ivrey
Jouhe
Lavangeot
Lavans-lès-Dole
Lemuy
Longwy-sur-le-Doubs
Louvatange
La Loye
Malange
Marnoz
Mathenay
Menotey
Mesnay
Miéry
Moissey
Molain
Molamboz
Molay
Monay
Monnières
Montbarrey
Monteplain
Montholier
Montigny-lès-Arsures
Montmarlon
Montmirey-la-Ville
Montmirey-le-Château
Mont-sous-Vaudrey
Mouchard
Mutigney
Neublans-Abergement
Neuvilley
Nevy-lès-Dole
Offlanges
Orchamps
Ougney
Ounans
Our
Oussières
Pagney
Pagnoz
Parcey
Peintre
Peseux
Petit-Noir
Picarreau
Les Planches-près-Arbois
Plasne
Pleure
Plumont
Pointre
Poligny
Pont-d'Héry
Port-Lesney
Pretin
Pupillin
Rahon
Rainans
Ranchot
Rans
Rochefort-sur-Nenon
Romain
Romange
Rouffange
Saint-Aubin
Saint-Baraing
Saint-Cyr-Montmalin
Saint-Lothain
Saint-Loup
Saint-Thiébaud
Saizenay
Salans
Saligney
Salins-les-Bains
Sampans
Santans
Séligney
Sermange
Serre-les-Moulières
Souvans
Tassenières
Tavaux
Taxenne
Thervay
Thésy
Tourmont
Vadans
Vaudrey
Vaux-sur-Poligny
La Vieille-Loye
Villeneuve-d'Aval
Villerserine
Villers-Farlay
Villers-les-Bois
Villers-Robert
Villette-lès-Arbois
Villette-lès-Dole
Vitreux
Vriange

History

The arrondissement of Dole was created in 1800. In May 2006 it gained the canton of Villers-Farlay from the arrondissement of Lons-le-Saunier, and it lost the canton of Chaumergy to the arrondissement of Lons-le-Saunier. At the January 2017 reorganisation of the arrondissements of Jura, it gained 67 communes from the arrondissement of Lons-le-Saunier.

As a result of the reorganisation of the cantons of France which came into effect in 2015, the borders of the cantons are no longer related to the borders of the arrondissements. The cantons of the arrondissement of Dole were, as of January 2015:

 Chaussin
 Chemin
 Dampierre
 Dole-Nord-Est
 Dole-Sud-Ouest
 Gendrey
 Montbarrey
 Montmirey-le-Château
 Rochefort-sur-Nenon
 Villers-Farlay

References

Dole